Ezra W. Wilkinson (February 6, 1801 – February 6, 1882) was a Massachusetts politician.

Personal life
Wilkinson was born in Attleborough, Massachusetts on February 14, 1801, to Noah Wilkinson. He was graduated at Brown University in 1824.

In person he was very tall and erect, even to the last days of his life. He was scrupulously neat in his attire. He was not easy or fluent in speech, but he was concise and accurate in his use of language.

He died in Dedham, but his remains were interred in Wrentham. At his funeral in St. Paul's Church, Dedham, a large number of members of the bar from Boston and elsewhere were in attendance. Resolutions of respect for his memory were presented in the Superior Court at Salem, and in Boston, shortly after his decease.

Career

Legal
Wilkinson began his professional studies with Hon. Peter Pratt, of Providence, Rhode Island, where he remained about a year, and he completed them in the office of Josiah J. Fiske, in Wrentham. He was admitted as an attorney of the Court of Common Pleas, at Dedham, Massachusetts at the September term, 1828. He was admitted as a counsellor of the Supreme Judicial Court, at Taunton, Massachusetts at the October term, 1832. He began practice at Freetown, Massachusetts and subsequently removed to Seekonk, Massachusetts.

In 1835, he removed to Dedham, and had an office in the same building formerly occupied by Fisher Ames, and then by Theron Metcalf. He was employed to collate and complete the records of the Norfolk County Courthouse, which had fallen into some confusion through the prolonged illness of Judge Ware, the clerk, who had then recently deceased. In 1843, he was appointed by Governor Marcus Morton as district attorney for the district then composed of Worcester and Norfolk Counties. He held this office until 1855.

In 1859, upon the establishment of the Superior Court, he was appointed one of the associate justices, being then nearly sixty years of age, and he held the office for more twenty-two years until his death in 1882. He had been in active practice for 31 years, so that his professional and judicial career covered a period of 53 years. He never took time off for illness or a vacation.

Within a month before his death, he held a term of court at Salem, Massachusetts.

Electoral
He was always a Democrat in politics. He was representative to the General Court from Dedham for three sessions in 1841, 1851, and 1856. He was the candidate of his party against John Quincy Adams for Congress in 1842. He was also a member of the Constitutional Convention of 1853.

Other
Wilkinson was a teacher and the head of Monmouth Academy.

References

Politicians from Dedham, Massachusetts
Lawyers from Dedham, Massachusetts
Educators from Dedham, Massachusetts
People from Wrentham, Massachusetts
People from Freetown, Massachusetts
1801 births
1882 deaths
District attorneys in Norfolk County, Massachusetts
District attorneys in Worcester County, Massachusetts
Members of the Massachusetts House of Representatives
Massachusetts state court judges